Albright is a town in central Preston County, West Virginia, United States, along the Cheat River. The population was 260 at the 2020 census. A former coal town, it is part of the Morgantown metropolitan area.

History

The town derives its name from David Albright, an early settler. In 1985, a mass flooding of the Cheat River wiped out most structures in the town.

Located near Albright is the Virginia Furnace, listed on the National Register of Historic Places in 1999.

The Albright Power Station, a former coal-fired power plant retired in 2012, sits across the Cheat River from Albright.

Geography

Demographics

2010 census
At the 2010 census, there were 299 people, 120 households and 79 families living in the town. The racial makeup of the town was 97.3% White, 0.3% African American, 1.0% Native American, and 1.3% from two or more races.

There were 120 households, of which 30.8% had children under the age of 18 living with them, 48.3% were married couples living together, 10.0% had a female householder with no husband present, 7.5% had a male householder with no wife present, and 34.2% were non-families. 30.8% of all households were made up of individuals, and 11.7% had someone living alone who was 65 years of age or older. The average household size was 2.49 and the average family size was 3.09.

The median age in the town was 38.2 years. 22.4% of residents were under the age of 18; 12.1% were between the ages of 18 and 24; 24.1% were from 25 to 44; 28.4% were from 45 to 64; and 13% were 65 years of age or older. The gender makeup of the town was 47.5% male and 52.5% female.

2000 census
At the 2000 census, there were 247 people, 99 households and 61 families living in the town. The population density was 857.9 per square mile (328.9/km2). There were 113 housing units at an average density of 392.5 per square mile (150.4/km2). The racial makeup of the town was 98.79% White, 0.40% African American, and 0.81% from two or more races.

There were 99 households, of which 33.3% had children under the age of 18 living with them, 46.5% were married couples living together, 9.1% had a female householder with no husband present, and 37.4% were non-families. 29.3% of all households were made up of individuals, and 11.1% had someone living alone who was 65 years of age or older. The average household size was 2.49 and the average family size was 3.06.

27.9% of the population were under the age of 18, 6.1% from 18 to 24, 31.2% from 25 to 44, 23.1% from 45 to 64, and 11.7% who were 65 years of age or older. The median age was 34 years. For every 100 females, there were 87.1 males. For every 100 females age 18 and over, there were 83.5 males.

The median household income was $21,389 and the median family income was $21,500. Males had a median income of $20,764 compared with $16,250 for females. The per capita income was $10,581. About 27.9% of families and 26.2% of the population were below the poverty line, including 36.6% of those under the age of eighteen and 27.3% of those 65 or over.

Climate
The climate in this area has mild differences between highs and lows, and there is adequate rainfall year-round.  According to the Köppen Climate Classification system, Albright has a humid subtropical climate, abbreviated "Cfa" on climate maps.

See also

 List of towns in West Virginia

References

External links

Towns in Preston County, West Virginia
Towns in West Virginia
Morgantown metropolitan area
Coal towns in West Virginia